The 1986 Ohio gubernatorial election was held on November 4, 1986. Incumbent Democratic Governor Dick Celeste ran against four time former Governor Jim Rhodes, who had previously defeated the last two incumbent Democratic governors in  1962 and  1974. The two had faced off before in 1978, with Rhodes winning by 47,536 votes for his fourth victory. Eight years later, at the age of 77, Rhodes was attempting to win a record fifth term. However, Celeste won by an even bigger margin than he did four years earlier, becoming the first Democrat to win consecutive elections for Governor since Frank Lausche, who won four consecutive times in 1948, 1950, 1952, and 1954. As of 2022, this is the last time a Democrat was re-elected Governor of Ohio and the only time a Democrat won a second four-year term. Democrats wouldn’t win another gubernatorial election in Ohio until 2006.

Democratic primary

Candidates
Dick Celeste, Governor of Ohio

Results

Republican primary

Candidates

Results

General election

Results

References

Gubernatorial
1986
Ohio